Two ships of the Iranian Navy have borne the name Joshan

 , a French-made  sunk in 1988
 , a  commissioned in 2006

External links
 wikimapia.org

Ship names